Niels Peter Jensen  (23 July 1802 – 19 October 1846) was a Danish composer, flutist and organist.

Biography
Niels Peter Jensen was an organ pupil of Friedrich Kuhlau. Since 1828 he was organist at St. Peter's Church (Petrikirche) in Copenhagen.  As well, he was a flute virtuoso and teacher. He composed incidental music and numerous pieces for flute and for piano.

Among his students included J.P.E. Hartmann.

Notable works

Flute

 3 Duos for 2 Flutes, Op.9 
 6 Duos for 2 Flutes, Op.16 
 12 Etudes for Flute, Op.25
 3 Fantasies-Caprices for Flute, Op.14

 Flute Sonata, Op.6
 Flute Sonata, Op.18
 6 Rondeaux Faciles, Op.13
 6 Solos for Flute, Op.17

See also
 List of Danish composers

References
This article was initially translated from the Danish Wikipedia.

1802 births
1846 deaths
19th-century classical composers
19th-century Danish composers
19th-century male musicians
Danish classical composers
Danish classical organists
Danish male classical composers
Danish Romantic composers
Male classical organists
19th-century organists